Bhai Harnirpal Singh a.k.a. "Kuku", former MLA of Muktsar constituency,  is the younger brother and political heir to the late Bhai Shaminder Singh. He is a member of Indian National Congress and was appointed an executive member of Punjab Pradesh Congress Committee (PPCC) and Member of the National Executive, Jatt Mahasabha by Captain Amarinder Singh, (President, PPCC).

He is appointed the General Seceretary, Punjab Pradesh Congress Committee (PPCC).

References

People from Sri Muktsar Sahib
Indian Sikhs
Living people
Sri Muktsar Sahib district
Indian National Congress politicians
Year of birth missing (living people)
Punjab MPAs 1997–1999
Indian National Congress politicians from Punjab, India